Pipara Simara (also Pipra Simra or Simara or Simra; Nepali: पिपरा सिमरा or सिमरा) is a town in Jitpursimara sub-metropolitan city in Bara District in Province No. 2 of south-eastern Nepal. The formerly Village Development Committee was merged to form a new municipality Gadhimai Municipality on 18 May 2014. Similarly, on 10 March 2017 Gadhimai Municipality, Inarwasira, Amlekhganj, as well as parts of Manharwa, Haraiya and Rampur Tokani were merged to form new Jitpursimara sub-metropolitan city. Aauraha, Ramban, Narbasti,Bajani etc are the village in Simara.Auraha lies in the east, Bajani in the south, Ramban & Narbasti in the west. At the time of the 2011 Nepal census it had a population of 23,835 people living in 5,253 individual households.

Climate

Transportation
Simara is connected with Birgunj in the South and with Pathlaiya in the north by the Tribhuvan Highway. Simara Airport was established on 4 July 1958.

Media
To promote local culture, giving peoples news and entertainment, Simara has three FM radio stations.
Radio Simara (106 MHz) is a community radio station and a new FM station is going to be on air soon called Radio Samarpan 98.2 MHz which is testing its transmission.

References

External links
 UN map of the municipalities of Bara District

Populated places in Bara District